Home Fire or Home Fires may refer to:

Literature
Home Fire (novel), a novel by Kamila Shamsie
 Home Fires (Katz book), a 1992 book by Don Katz
 Home Fires (novel), a 2011 novel by Gene Wolfe

Music
Home Fire, a 1991 album by Ron Kavana
 Home Fires (Dead Ringer Band album), an album by Dead Ringer Band

Television
 Home Fires (British TV series), a drama series that debuted in 2015
 Home Fires (Canadian TV series), a drama series that debuted in 1980
 Home Fires (Upstairs, Downstairs), episode 6 of Upstairs, Downstairs series 4

See also
Keep the Home Fires Burning (disambiguation)
Structure fire, a fire in a home or other building